Zaheer Iqbal Channar is a Pakistani politician, who had been a member of the Provincial Assembly of the Punjab from August 2018 till January 2023.

Political career
Zaheer was elected as the member of the Provincial Assembly of the Punjab for the first time on PML-N ticket from Constituency PP-245 (Bahawalpur-I) in 2018 Pakistani general election. He received 47,177 votes defeating Asghar Joya, the Pakistan Tehreek-e-Insaf candidate.

References

Living people
Saraiki people
Pakistan Muslim League (N) MPAs (Punjab)
Punjab MPAs 2018–2023
Year of birth missing (living people)